Christopher Kwaku Nayo (26 September 1926 – 2003) was a Ghanaian politician and member of the first parliament of the second republic of Ghana representing Buem Constituency under the membership of the National Alliance of Liberals (NAL).

Education and early life 
He was born 26 September 1926 in Volta Region of Ghana. He attended Presbyterian Teachers' Training College where he obtained Teachers' Training Certificate. He also obtained his Bachelor of Arts degree in Basic Education from The University of Ghana, Legon and he also attended University of London.

Politics 
He began his political career in 1969 when he became the parliamentary candidate for the National Alliance of Liberals (NAL) to represent Buem constituency prior to the commencement of the 1969 Ghanaian parliamentary election. He assumed office as a member of the first parliament of the second republic of Ghana on 1 October 1969 after being pronounced winner at the 1969 Ghanaian parliamentary election and was later suspended following the overthrow of the Busia government on 13 January 1972.

Personal life 
He was a Christian. He was a Teacher.

See also 

 Busia government
 List of MPs elected in the 1969 Ghanaian parliamentary election

References 

Ghanaian MPs 1969–1972
1926 births
2003 deaths
People from Volta Region
University of Ghana alumni
National Alliance of Liberals politicians